LIAZ (LIberecké Automobilové Závody – Liberec Automobil Works) is a defunct Czech and Czechoslovak manufacturer of trucks. The company was formed in 1951 by the government as a division of Škoda, incorporating eight other truck manufacturers into a single conglomerate. In 1953 LIAZ became independent of Škoda but still continued to use its name until 1984 (Škoda LIAZ). After the 1989 revolution, there was however a significant loss of production.

History
LIAZ's headquarters in Liberec were where the former Reichenberger Automobil Fabrik (RAF) had been located. RAF operated in Liberec in 1907, in 1912 it was bought by Laurin & Klement, and in 1916 moved its production technology to Mladá Boleslav to leave Liberec's production facilities to textile entrepreneurs.

Škoda LIAZ's main truck plants were in Liberec, Rýnovice, Mnichovo Hradiště and Jablonec nad Nisou. Later on, factories in Mělník, Zvolen, Veľký Krtíš, Přerov and Holýšov were added. LIAZ has gradually grown and increased its staff and production levels - in 1975 it employed 11,000 workers and produced 13,600 utility vehicles annually. In the 1970s LIAZ was the biggest Czechoslovak truck manufacturer, with an annual production of 15,000 trucks with the plant running at full capacity.

However, after the 1989 revolution and subsequent economic problems, LIAZ lost almost all of its sales and was unable to find new, and so the production gradually declined. Not even the introduction of a new, modern Škoda 400 line (Xena and Fox) could help the company to achieve better results. In 2000, the company was bought by Slovakian Sipox Holding, which however did not have enough money to finance production. Production ceased in September 2003.

Tedom Truck, based in Třebíč, bought in 2006 all the rights to produce LIAZ trucks, including the factory, technical documentation, and know-how for engine production. It produced the Fox model line series and modernized older LIAZ vehicles. However, the company entered liquidation on 1 January 2010. So instead of the planned 5,000 vehicles annually, only 19 were made, of which 9 were modernized LIAZ vehicles.

The LIAZ brand was bought by holding Czechoslovak Group and on 22 December 2017, LIAZ Trucks was established.

Trucks 

 1940—1952 - Škoda 706 D
 1952—1958 - Škoda 706 R, developed from the pre-war 706 D
 1957—1990 - Škoda 706 RT - a cab-over design with LIAZ' own 12-liter inline-six of the M 634 series
 1969—1990 - Škoda 706 MT - used the frame, engine, and cab of the RT, but was intended for special uses. They were fitted with splitter transmissions and planetary drive rear axles, all to increase max loads.
 1974—2003 - 100 series
 1990—1995 - 200 series
 1992—2003 - 300 series
 S
 FZ
 1996—2003 - 400 Xena/Fox (tractor/truck)
 The engine plant of LIAZ trucks has been purchased by TEDOM Trucks which has also purchased all the technical data and drawings and is now marketing LIAZ Concept Trucks under the brand of FOX. In the late nineties, LIAZ in Jablonec and Nisou was mainly producing diesel engines that were assembled and tested at the industrial estate.
  The engine line production actually tested every single engine by running it and collecting various parameters about it. Every n-th engine was sent to disassembly to check for any engine tolerances.  The testing rigs were called Brzda (brake) where the engine was connected to fuel, exhaust extraction piping, and electronic probes.
 The industrial estate of LIAZ has also been used for the production of steam which is routinely used to heat housing estates. This highly pressurized steam is piped to smaller transformer stations around the town of Jablonec nad Nisou.  In the transformer stations, the pressure is reduced and used for heating blocks of flats.

A few examples of products
 
R series (1952–1958)

RT series (1957–1990)

MT series (1969–1990)

100 series (1974–2003)

200 series (1990–1995)

300 series (1992–2003)

400 series (1996–2003)

TEDOM 400 (2006–2009)

Motorsport 

Notable achievements of LIAZ in motorsport

Paris-Dakar and other rallies(more information and images)

 1985 – first Czech team on Rallye Dakar
 1985 – 1st place on Rallye des Pharaons (category: trucks over 12 t), Heritier-Kovář-Brzobohatý
 1987 – 3rd place on Rallye Dakar, Moskal-Joklík-Záleský
 1987 – 1st place on Rallye Jelcz, Krejsa-Brzobohatý-Joklík
 1988 – 2nd place on Rallye Dakar, Moskal-Vojtíšek-Záleský
 1988 – 1st place on Rallye Jelcz, Svoboda-Fajtl-Joklík
 1992 – 1st place on Rallye des Pharaons (category: trucks over 12 t), Kakrda-Fajtl-Joklík
 2009 1st place on Baja Spain, Macík-Macík jr.-Kalina
 2009 – 2nd place on Baja Hungaria, Macík-Macík jr.
 2012 – 3rd place on Rally El Chott, Spáčil-Vodrhánek-Chytka

European truck racing championship (more information and images)
 1987 – first Czech team in European championship
 1989 – 2nd place in European championship (class: A), Frankie Vojtíšek
 1989 – 1st place in Great Britain Championship, Frankie Vojtíšek
 1990 – 2nd place in European championship (class: A), Frankie Vojtíšek
 1990 – 1st place in Great Britain Championship, Frankie Vojtíšek
 1990 – 2nd place in 24h truck race Le Mans
 1993 – 3rd place in European championship (class: B), Frankie Vojtíšek
 1994 – first Czech truck in class Super Race Truck
 1997 – 3rd place in European championship (class: Race Truck), Frankie Vojtíšek

European truck-trial championship (more information and images)

 1991 – first Czech team in European championship
 1991 – 1st place in European championship (class P2), Kakrda – Král 
 1992 – 1st place in European championship (class P2), Kakrda – Birke 
 1993 – 1st place in European championship (class S3), Filip – Joklík 
 1995 – 1st place in European championship (class P2), Filip – Záleský

References
Podbielski, Zdzisław: Samochody ciężarowe, specjalne i autobusy, Nasza Księgarnia, Warsaw, 1988,

External links 

History of LIAZ in Czech
LIAZ - a legendary trucks from the Czech Republic

Škoda
Defunct companies of the Czech Republic
Motor vehicle manufacturers of Czechoslovakia
Defunct motor vehicle manufacturers of Czechoslovakia
Truck manufacturers of the Czech Republic
Vehicle manufacturing companies established in 1953
Vehicle manufacturing companies disestablished in 2003
1953 establishments in Czechoslovakia
2003 disestablishments in the Czech Republic
Defunct manufacturing companies of Czechoslovakia
Defunct manufacturing companies of the Czech Republic
Defunct motor vehicle manufacturers of the Czech Republic